Bagcheea is a genus of fungi in the family Gnomoniaceae. The genus contains three species.

References

External links
Bagcheea at Index Fungorum

Gnomoniaceae
Sordariomycetes genera